News at Seven is a Philippine television news broadcasting show broadcast by GMA Radio-Television Arts. Hosted by Tina Monzon-Palma and Jose Mari Velez, it premiered on November 1, 1976 replacing GMA Evening Report. The show concluded on May 16, 1986. It was replaced by GMA Balita.

Anchors
 Tina Monzon-Palma 
 Bong Lapira 
 José Mari Velez 
 Raffy Marcelo 
 Jimmy Gil 
 Amado Pineda

References

1976 Philippine television series debuts
1986 Philippine television series endings
English-language television shows
GMA Network news shows
Philippine television news shows